Zhao Zhifang (born August 11, 1994 in Langfang, Hebei) is a Chinese female professional basketball player. She represented China in the women's basketball competition at the 2016 Summer Olympics.

References

External links

Chinese women's basketball players
Basketball players at the 2016 Summer Olympics
Olympic basketball players of China
Basketball players from Hebei
People from Langfang
1994 births
Living people
Guards (basketball)
Tianjin University of Finance and Economics alumni
Shanxi Flame players
Bayi Kylin players